Lumberjack Stadium is a 1,000 seat multi-purpose stadium in Flagstaff, Arizona owned by Northern Arizona University. It is home to the NAU Lumberjacks women's soccer, cross country, and outdoor track and field teams.

History 
In 1957, the Northern Arizona Lumberjacks football team played on the field from 1960 to 1977, later relocating to the Walkup Skydome.

Renovation 
In 2011, the stadium went through a major $106 million renovation that connected it to the school's new Health and Learning Center (HLC). The new modern facilities for the stadium included 1,000 covered seats, newly painted field, offices, locker rooms, concessions, and a resurfaced track. The field itself was renamed Max Spilsbury Field at Lumberjack Stadium.

References 

Sports venues completed in 1957
Northern Arizona Lumberjacks
1957 establishments in Arizona
Soccer venues in Arizona
Buildings and structures in Flagstaff, Arizona
Defunct college football venues
Defunct American football venues in the United States
American football venues in Arizona
College track and field venues in the United States
Northern Arizona Lumberjacks track and field